Frances Victória Velho Rodrigues (born 1952) is a Mozambique Diplomat and ambassador for Mozambique.

Rodrigues was born in 1952. She has served with the Foreign ministry of her country since 1977. She has been her country's ambassador to Belgium, Luxembourg, the Netherlands, the IAEA, Austria and, from 2014 to 2018, to Sweden, Norway, Finland and Iceland. She has also been the Permanent Representative to the United Nations.

References

1952 births
Living people
Permanent Representatives of Mozambique to the United Nations
Ambassadors of Mozambique to Belgium
Ambassadors of Mozambique to Luxembourg
Ambassadors of Mozambique to the Netherlands
Ambassadors of Mozambique to Austria
Ambassadors of Mozambique to Sweden
Ambassadors of Mozambique to Finland
Ambassadors of Mozambique to Norway
Ambassadors of Mozambique to Iceland
Mozambican women diplomats
Women ambassadors